Pleasant Valley is an unincorporated community in Dodge County, Nebraska, United States.

History
A post office was established at Pleasant Valley in 1872, and remained in operation until it was discontinued in 1903.

References

Unincorporated communities in Dodge County, Nebraska
Unincorporated communities in Nebraska